Edward Bond (born 1934) is a British playwright.

Edward Bond may also refer to:

 Edward A. Bond (1849–1929), NY State Engineer and Surveyor 1899–1904
 Edward Augustus Bond (1815–1898), English librarian
 Edward Bond (politician) (1844–1920), English Conservative politician